Group cognition is a social, largely linguistic phenomenon whereby a group of people produce a sequence of utterances that performs a cognitive act. That is, if a similar sequence was uttered or thought by an individual it would be considered an act of cognition or thinking. The group can be a small group, such as 3–5 people talking together or working together online. The group can also be a larger collective, such as a classroom of students or a global community contributing asynchronously to an extended discourse on a problem or topic or to a knowledge repository like Wikipedia. The theory of group cognition is a postcognitivism philosophy, which considers a larger unit of analysis than an individual mind as a producer of cognitive activities such as creative problem solving.

Concepts of Group Cognition 

Group cognition refers to an analytic viewpoint that looks beyond individual cognition to include the interaction of individuals with other people, with artifacts and with cultural resources as producing cognitive products through their interaction. Accordingly, cognition or thinking can be analyzed in a number of ways:

•	An individual thinks and speaks. The thought takes place in the individual’s mind (inside the head) and can be expressed in the (external) world through speech, gesture, writing, artifacts. This has been a traditional cognition view since Descartes.

•	A small group of people collaborates, usually through spoken or written communication, and produces utterances or other products that cannot be attributed to any one of the group members by themselves. The individuals may build on each other’s ideas (transaction). Also, there may be group processes or features of the group interaction, which themselves contribute to the small-group cognition.

•	One or more people may interact with various kinds of artifacts, such as software applications or software agents, resulting in extended cognition.

•	One or more people may interact within a social setting, such as a culture or a socio-technical system, resulting in social cognition or situated learning.

•	Larger groups of people, artifacts and cultural settings (activity systems) may interact, resulting in collective intelligence or distributed cognition.

Small-Group Cognition 

Small groups of people can engage in activities such as mathematical problem solving and can accomplish intellectual achievements. These accomplishments often proceed by means of interactions in which ideas emerge from the discourse between multiple perspectives and cannot be credited to any one person. An utterance by one person is elicited by and responds to the previous discussion and group context in ways that would otherwise not have arisen, and the utterance is structured so as to elicit specific kinds of responses from other participants. Through a sequence of complexly and subtly interwoven interactions, cognitive results are achieved. The meaning of what was said is determined at the group level of the interactions, and is not in general attributable primarily to the expression of pre-existing mental representations of the individual participants.

Of course, small-group cognition relies on the ability of the participating individuals to interpret and understand the group meaning. But even this individual understanding is fundamentally situated in, and emerges from, the interactions of the group, which are structured so as to coordinate these understandings. The philosophy of group cognition does not deny individual cognition, but calls for a re-thinking of the ontology, epistemology and methodology for exploring mind.

Social psychologists, sociologists and organizational theorist have occasionally referred to group cognition. However, these disciplines have generally rejected the notion for fear of conjuring up images of trans-personal "metaphysical" phenomena. Sociologists emphasized the negative possibilities of "group think" or "mass psychology", whereby members of a group are persuaded by peer pressure to forsake their own individual rationality. Psychology is focused on the individual as the unit of analysis. Twentieth century psychology reacts against popularized readings of earlier idealist philosophy and tends to reduce social phenomena to individual psychology or rational calculations of self-interest of individuals.

Other Forms of Group Cognition

Analyzing Online Group Cognition 

Online interactions, if carefully planned for, can provide ideal data for research on group cognition. If the interaction takes place through text and persistent drawings, logs can preserve an excellent detailed record of virtually everything that took place across the network. Thus, one can analyze everything that was available to the participants and shared by them. In contrast to video analysis, there is no need to worry about camera angles, lighting, transcriptions, interview protocols, coding reliability, etc. to produce an accurate and useful record.

The data can be analyzed for evidence of the accomplishment of problem solving and other tasks (group cognition) through collaborative interaction within the online group. This can be achieved through close analysis of how groups of participants co-construct shared meanings and sustain joint activities through the sequentiality and relatedness of their situated contributions and their social participation. There are many questions that cannot be addressed this way, such as what goes on in individual heads and what is remembered by specific participants years later. But these issues are beyond the scope of a group-cognition research agenda. The group accomplishments have been largely ignored in previous educational research, but may constitute what is unique to computer-supported collaborative learning (CSCL) and most promising for the future of computer support for building collaborative knowledge.

Research and Analysis

The Virtual Math Teams (VMT) Research Project 
The Virtual Math Teams (VMT) research project was directed by Gerry Stahl from 2003–2014. It is continuing at the Math Forum as part of NCTM. The VMT project is a prototypical example of Computer-supported collaborative learning research.

The VMT research group at Drexel University and the Math Forum has developed a methodology for chat analysis that is tuned to the exploration of small-group cognition in a chat environment. This approach is inspired by ethnomethodologically-informed conversation analysis, but the domain differs in multiple significant ways from that of most conversation analysis: Chat is online so neither the participants nor their production of utterances is visible; interactions are text-based so they lack intonation, personality, accent; the topics are math problem solving, rather than socializing; the participants are primarily teenage students engaged in learning, not adult domain experts; the groups are usually 3 to 5 instead of dyads and the participants generally do not know each other.

The VMT Project's analysis looks closely, line-by-line, at how chat postings build upon each other sequentially; how they respond to previous postings and elicit future ones; how they establish the social order of the group interaction; how they repair problems of co-construction of shared group meanings; how they construct, reference, remember and name resources that they use in their meaning-making. Analysis considers the context within which interactions occur, building up understanding of types of interaction through which targeted hypotheses can be explored in quasi-experimental investigations, ethnographic observation or structured interviews.

The aim of the VMT Project is to understand students interactions, for example: How students approach a given problem and make use of the affordances of their technology? How do different technical details change or mediate the interactions and the methods that students develop? Such understanding can guide the design of CSCL systems to support effective networked learning.

Other Research Centers or Projects

The Small-Group Unit of Analysis

Small-group cognition focuses on the small group as the unit of analysis. In this, it contrasts with theories that are oriented to larger units like communities of practice as well as to the individual person. In this sense, the theory of small-group cognition complements theories like distributed cognition and cultural-historical activity theory as well as individual cultural psychology. Small-group cognition theory proposes that small groups are the "engines of knowledge building." The knowing that groups build up in manifold forms is what becomes internalized by their members as individual learning and externalized in their communities as certifiable knowledge. In this sense, the small-group phenomena underlie much of what takes place at the larger scale.

The Russian psychologist Lev Vygotsky argued that higher-level human cognition is not a biological given aptitude. Rather, individual cognition is developed gradually through social interaction. Various adult intellectual abilities are results of internalization processes through which interpersonal interactions are transformed. For instance, speech begins with talk among people in small groups and dyads. Gradually, young children around the age of four transform speech with others into self-talk, and later into silent speech. The flow of silent speech evolves into the thought of the individual. Such a view reverses the perspective of reductionist psychology and argues for a developmental priority of group cognition. In this sense, the small-group phenomena underlie much of what takes place at the individual scale.

Writings on Group Cognition

Writings on Small-Group Cognition 

•	Stahl discusses the potential of computer and network technology to promote group cognition. It reflects on the methodology for analyzing group cognition and provides some analyzed examples of small group cognitive interaction. The author coined the term group cognition while writing this book. The term had rarely been used before. The motivation for the VMT research project emerges from the previous CSCW and CSCL studies reported in this book.

•	Stahl presents 28 chapters analyzing various aspects of the study of group cognition as conducted by the Virtual Math Teams Project. Chapters are written by the editor, Gerry Stahl, and other members of the VMT research team, visiting researchers who worked on the project and international colleagues. The VMT project was designed specifically to study group cognition in small teams of students discussing mathematics online. A scientific methodology for designing experiments, collecting data, analyzing logs and developing theory is discussed in the book. A number of case studies of excerpts from logs are included. Several chapters discuss larger implications and philosophic issues.

•	Stahl discusses the potential of computer and network technology to promote group cognition. It reflects on the design-based research methodology for analyzing group cognition and provides some analyzed examples of small group cognitive interaction. It includes philosophic, technical, historical, mathematical and pedagogical considerations—providing a multi-faceted view of the VMT research project.

•	 Stahl is a monograph analyzing the work of a group of three students as they become introduced to dynamic mathematics during eight hour-long online sessions using VMT with GeoGebra. The monograph documents the team's development of mathematical group cognition. Introductory chapters motivate the study and discuss its case-study method. Concluding chapters reflect on the group-cognitive development and its implications for re-design of the math curriculum.

•	Stahl discusses the philosophical foundations of small-group cognition. It collects important theoretical articles in the CSCL journal as well as publications by the editor, Gerry Stahl on associated concepts and methodologies.

See also

•	Computer-Supported Collaborative Learning (CSCL)

•	Cultural-Historical Activity Theory (CHAT)

•	Distributed Cognition

•	Situated cognition

•	Collective intelligence

•	Actor-network theory

•	Macrocognition

External links
 International Journal of Computer-Supported Collaborative Learning (ijCSCL) is an ISI-indexed, peer-reviewed international journal of CSCL. It is published by Springer electronically and in print. Pre-publication versions of all articles are available for free at this site.

References

Educational psychology
Collaboration

de:Gruppendenken